Kravis is a surname. Notable people with the surname include: 

Henry Kravis (born 1944), American businessman
Irving Kravis (1917–1992), American economist
Janis Kravis (1935–2020), Latvian architect
Marie-Josée Kravis (born 1949), Canadian businessperson